Fulneck Moravian Settlement is a village in Pudsey in the City of Leeds metropolitan borough, West Yorkshire, England.

Fulneck may also refer to:

Places

England 
 Fulneck Moravian Church
 Fulneck School

People 
 Jakub Fulnek (born 1994)

Sports 
 Fotbal Fulnek

See also 
 Fulnek, a town in Northern Moravia, Czech Republic